Robert Collet (born 6 May 1948 in Chantilly, Oise) is a French thoroughbred racehorse trainer.
Robert Collet was one of the first European trainers to win a Breeders' Cup race when he won the 1986 edition of the Breeders' Cup Mile at Hollywood Park Racetrack with Last Tycoon. In 1987, Collet achieved the extraordinary feat of winning three Group one races on three different continents with the same horse when Le Glorieux captured the Deutschland-Preis in Europe, the Washington, D.C. International in North America and the Japan Cup in Asia.

Robert Collet's son Rodolphe "Rod" Collet, is also a successful racehorse trainer.

References
 
 Robert Collet at the NTRA

1948 births
Living people
People from Chantilly, Oise
French horse trainers
Sportspeople from Oise